Kuwait is divided into 6 governorates (muhafazah). The governorates are further subdivided into areas. The governorate is headed by a Governor appointed by a ministerial decree for a period of 4 years which can be renewed upon the proposal of the Prime Minister.

History
The beginning of the formation of governorates in the State of Kuwait started back in 1962 with the Emiri decree No. 6 which divided the Kuwait into three governorates i.e. Al Asimah Governorate, Ḩawallī Governorate and Al Aḩmadi Governorate. Later, Jahra Governorate, Farwaniya Governorate and Mubarak Al-Kabeer Governorate were formed in 1979, 1988 and 1999 respectively.

Governorates

See also
Demographics of Kuwait
Areas of Kuwait
ISO 3166-2:KW

References

External links

 
 Subdivisions of Kuwait
Kuwait, Governorates
Kuwait 1
Governorates, Kuwait
 Kuwait geography-related lists
Kuwait